Ivan Stefanov Tsonchev was a Bulgarian Army General and revolutionary (komitadji).

Biography 

Ivan Tsonchev was born on 19 August 1859 in Dryanovo, then in the Ottoman Empire. He became a volunteer and a participant in the Russo-Turkish War from 1877-1878. After the establishment of the Bulgarian Principality he became an officer and participated in the Serbian-Bulgarian War of 1885. Later he was the leader of the Supreme Macedonian-Adrianople Revolutionary Committee in the period 1901-1903. Tsonchev was the main organizer of the Gorna Dzhumaya Uprising in 1902 and a participant in the Ilinden-Preobrazhenie Uprising in 1903.

There were many Bulgarian officers who fought at the time of the revolutionary struggles in Macedonia, but among them there was only one general and this was Ivan Tsonchev. He did so in spite of the arrests, internships and repressions organized by the government, he had been periodically a subject.

General Ivan Tsonchev died on 16 December 1910.

References

1859 births
1910 deaths
People from Dryanovo
Bulgarian revolutionaries
Bulgarian military personnel
Bulgarian generals
Bulgarian nationalists